Sabrael is an Angel named in the Testament of Solomon and 3 Enoch.

References 

Archangels
Individual angels